Pierre Amiet (29 April 1922 – 20 April 2021) was a French archeologist and conservator. He specialized in the Ancient Near East.

Biography
Amiet's family left Alsace for Paris in 1939, and he studied at the École du Louvre and the Sorbonne. From 1950 to 1954, he participated in excavation campaigns in Tirzah. Upon his return from Samaria, he was married and later achieved his doctorate with a thesis titled La glyptique mésopotamienne archaïque. The thesis focused on iconographic evolution of the cylinder seal, and it was published in 1961.

After his time as a conservator, he taught at the École du Louvre, and served as Inspector General of Museum of France. He directed the Department of Eastern Antiquities at the Louvre from 1968 to 1988. He directed the journal Revue d’assyriologie et d’archéologie orientale until 2010.

Pierre Amiet died in Paris on 20 April 2021 at the age of 98.

Publications
L'Art d'Agadé au musée du Louvre (1976)
L’Art antique du Moyen-Orient (1977)[6]

References

1922 births
2021 deaths
Archaeologists from Strasbourg
University of Paris alumni